Miss Universe Germany is a national Beauty pageant in Germany to select an official candidate for the Miss Universe pageant.

History
Miss Germany started in 1952. Miss Universe Germany started in 2009. Currently, the German franchise of Miss Universe is owned by former Miss Universe Germany winner Natalie Ackermann. She is also the franchiser of Miss Universe Colombia in Colombia. In Miss Universe Germany all the States of Germany but also some of the regions are represented as well.

1952-1999
In 1952 Miss Germany started with Renate Hoy as the first winner, who then became 4th Runner-up at Miss Universe. In 1961, Germany has the official winner of Miss Universe 1961, Marlene Schmidt. From 1985 : MGC - Miss Germany Corporation GmbH (Oldenburg), the official winner will be selecting by the organization. In 1991, the MGA (Miss Germany Association, Bergheim near Cologne) of Detlef Tursies run a Miss Germany pageant for the first time. The winners participate in Miss Universe. In 1999, MGA transforms into MGO (Miss Germany Organisation). From 2000, they award the title Miss Deutschland, and change their name again: MGO - Komitee Miss Deutschland. In 1999 is the last of Miss Germany Company sent the candidate for Miss Universe, she is Diana Drubig.

2000-2008
Miss Deutschland came into being in 2000, inheriting the since 1952 established official winner of Miss Germany pageant, that would compete at the international Miss Universe pageant. On occasion, when the winner does not qualify (due to age) for either contest, a runner-up is sent. After 2008, Miss Germany for Miss Universe selected by Miss Universe Deutschland pageant.

International crowns 
 One – Miss Universe winner: Marlene Schmidt (1961)

Titleholders

Miss Universe Germany

Miss Deutschland 2000-2008

Miss Germany 1952-1999

State rankings

See also

Miss Germany

Official website
missuniversegermany.de

References

 
Beauty pageants in Germany
Recurring events established in 1952
1952 establishments in Germany
Germany
German awards